Hartland High School can refer to:

Hartland High School (Michigan) in Hartland Township, Michigan, United States
Hartland High School (New Brunswick) in Hartland, New Brunswick, Canada